Kud Wafter is a visual novel developed by Key and published by VisualArt's in 2010. The story follows the lives of Riki Naoe and his close friend Kudryavka as they start to see more of each other in a romantic relationship. The discography of Kud Wafter consists of one single, one soundtrack, and three remix album. The core of the discography is the original soundtrack album produced by Key Sounds Label in 2010. The music on the soundtrack was composed and arranged by Jun'ichi Shimizu, Manack, and Donmaru. Four remix albums were released between 2010 and 2020.

Albums

Kud Wafter Original Soundtrack
The Kud Wafter Original Soundtrack, from the visual novel Kud Wafter, was first released with the limited edition of the original game on June 25, 2010 in Japan produced by Key Sounds Label bearing the catalog number KSLA-0057. The album contains one disc with 24 music tracks composed, arranged, and produced by Jun'ichi Shimizu and Manack. Miyako Suzuta provides vocals for three songs: "One's Future (Rock Band Mix)", "Hoshimori Uta" and "Hoshimori Uta (a cappella ver.)"; Haruka Shimotsuki provides vocals for the song "Hoshikuzu". The album was re-released on December 29, 2011 bearing the catalog number KSLA-0077 and contained the additional track "Hoshizora".

Albina: Assorted Kudwaf Songs
Albina: Assorted Kudwaf Songs is an arrange album which contains a selection of songs from the visual novel Kud Wafter, remixed by Jun'ichi Shimizu and Akane Doi. The album is otherwise composed by Jun'ichi Shimizu. It was first released on December 29, 2010 in Japan by Key Sounds Label bearing the catalog number KSLA-0066. The album contains one disc with ten tracks, and the first track "Overture" is original to the album. Miyako Suzuta provides vocals for two songs: "One's Word" and "Fragment"; Duca provides vocals for the song "Albina"; and Asari provides vocals for "Toriniku no Uta". After the tenth track "Hoshizora", there is the hidden track "Hoshikuzu" by Haruka Shimotsuki; this is the same "Hoshikuzu" track released previously on the Kud Wafter Original Soundtrack. The album was re-released on December 29, 2011 bearing the catalog number KSLA-0078 and contained 12 tracks. In addition to the original ten tracks, the hidden track "Hoshikuzu" was split into its own track, and the new track "Fragment Kud.ver" by Miyako Suzuta was also included.

Deejay Busters!
Deejay Busters! is a remix album of songs taken from the Little Busters!, Little Busters! Ecstasy and Kud Wafter visual novels and remixed into electronic dance music. It was originally released on May 8, 2011 at the Rewrite Fes. promotional event in Japan by Key Sounds Label bearing the catalog number KSLA-0068, and was later released for general sale on May 27, 2011. The album contains one disc with ten tracks originally composed by Jun Maeda, Shinji Orito and Jun'ichi Shimizu, and features ten separate remix artists. Of the ten tracks, 1, 2, 3, 9, and 10 are from Little Busters! and Ecstasy, while the others are from Kud Wafter. Four artists provide vocals for five songs: Rita sings "Little Busters!" and "Alicemagic", Miyako Suzuta sings "One's Future", Lia sings "Saya's Song", and Haruka Shimotsuki sings "Hoshikuzu".

Ripresa
Ripresa is a piano arrange album with songs taken from the Little Busters!, Little Busters! Ecstasy and Kud Wafter visual novels  and arranged into piano versions. It was released on April 26, 2013 in Japan by Key Sounds Label bearing the catalog number KSLA-0089. The album contains one disc with ten tracks, eight of which are from Little Busters! and Ecstasy and the other two, tracks 5 and 9, are from Kud Wafter. The album is composed and produced by Jun Maeda, PMMK and Jun'ichi Shimizu; all the tracks are arranged by Manyo.

Summer Chronicle
Summer Chronicle is a remix album with music tracks taken from the Air, Kud Wafter and Summer Pockets visual novels and arranged into violin and piano versions by Hironori Anazawa. The album is otherwise composed by Jun Maeda, Shinji Orito, Magome Togoshi, Jun'ichi Shimizu and Donmaru. It was released on August 22, 2020 in Japan by Key Sounds Label bearing the catalog number KSLA-0170. The album contains one disc with ten tracks; tracks 1–4 are from Air, tracks 5 and 6 are from Kud Wafter, and tracks 7–10 are from Summer Pockets.

One's Future
"One's Future" is a single from the visual novel Kud Wafter containing the game's opening theme song sung by Miyako Suzuta and was first released on April 23, 2010 by Key Sounds Label bearing the catalog number KSLA-0056. The single contains five tracks including original, remix and instrumental versions of "One's Future", and a background music track from the game titled "Adagio for Summer Wind". The single is composed, arranged, and produced by Jun'ichi Shimizu and Manack.

References

Discographies of Japanese artists
Key Sounds Label
Video game music discographies